Jack McNee was a Scottish football player during the 1940s and 1950s. He started his career with junior side Carluke Rovers before signing for Dumbarton where he was a constant in the defence for seven seasons.

References 

Scottish footballers
Dumbarton F.C. players
Scottish Football League players
Possibly living people
Association football fullbacks
Year of birth missing